Baudilio Jáuregui Pelayo (born July 9, 1945) is a Uruguayan former footballer who played as a centre-back. He played for clubs of Uruguay, Argentina and Chile, and the Uruguay national team in the 1974 FIFA World Cup in West Germany.

Honours
Defensor Sporting
 Uruguayan Primera División: 1976

Cobreloa
 Chilean Primera División: 1980

References

External links
 

1945 births
Living people
Uruguayan footballers
Association football central defenders
Uruguay international footballers
1974 FIFA World Cup players
Uruguayan Primera División players
Argentine Primera División players
Chilean Primera División players
Defensor Sporting players
Club Atlético River Plate (Montevideo) players
Club Atlético River Plate footballers
Cobreloa footballers
Uruguayan football managers
Defensor Sporting managers
Uruguayan expatriate footballers
Uruguayan expatriate sportspeople in Chile
Expatriate footballers in Chile
Uruguayan expatriate sportspeople in Argentina
Expatriate footballers in Argentina
Deportes Tolima managers